Makarovo is a rural locality (a selo) in Kubenskoye Rural Settlement, Vologodsky District, Vologda Oblast, Russia. The population was 530 as of 2002.

Geography 
The distance to Vologda is 50 km.

References 

Rural localities in Vologodsky District